Glenloch may refer to:

Glenloch, Georgia, an unincorporated community
Glenloch, Peachtree City, Georgia, a village in Peachtree City
Glenloch, Pennsylvania, an unincorporated community in Chester County
Glenloch Interchange, a road junction in Canberra, ACT
Glenlock, Kansas, formerly spelled Glenloch, an unincorporated community in Anderson County